Roger Fenton (28 March 1819 – 8 August 1869) was a British photographer, noted as one of the first war photographers.

Fenton was born into a Lancashire merchant family. After graduating from London with an Arts degree, he became interested in painting and later developed a keen interest in the new technology of photography after seeing early examples at The Great Exhibition in 1851. Within a year, he began exhibiting his own photographs. He became a leading British photographer and instrumental in founding the Photographic Society (later the Royal Photographic Society). In 1854, he was commissioned to document events occurring in Crimea, where he became one of a small group of photographers to produce images of the final stages of the Crimean War.

Early life
Fenton was born in Crimble Hall, Heywood, Lancashire, on 28 March 1819. His grandfather was a wealthy cotton manufacturer and banker, whilst his father, John, was a banker and from 1832 a member of parliament. Fenton was the fourth of seven children by his father's first marriage. His father had 10 more children by his second wife. 

In 1840 Fenton graduated with a "first class" Bachelor of Arts degree from the University of London, having read English, mathematics, Greek and Latin. In 1841, he began to read law at University College, London, evidently sporadically as he did not qualify as a solicitor until 1847, partly because he had become interested in learning to be a painter. In Yorkshire in 1843 Fenton married Grace Elizabeth Maynard, presumably after his first sojourn in Paris (his passport was issued in 1842) where he may briefly have studied painting in the studio of Paul Delaroche. When he registered as a copyist in the Louvre in 1844 he named his teacher as the history and portrait painter Michel Martin Drolling, who taught at the École nationale supérieure des Beaux-Arts, but Fenton's name does not appear in the school records. By 1847 Fenton had returned to London where he continued to study painting under the tutelage of the history painter Charles Lucy, who became his friend and with whom, starting in 1850, he served on the board of the North London School of Drawing and Modelling. In 1849, 1850 and 1851 he exhibited paintings in the annual exhibitions of the Royal Academy.

Fenton visited the Great Exhibition in Hyde Park in London in 1851 and was impressed by the photography on display there. He then visited Paris to learn the waxed paper calotype process, most likely from Gustave Le Gray who had modified the methods employed by William Henry Fox Talbot, its inventor. By 1852 he had photographs exhibited in Britain, and travelled to Kiev, Moscow and St. Petersburg, and also photographed views and architecture around Britain. His published call for the setting up of a photographic society was answered in 1853 with the establishment of the Photographic Society, with Fenton as founder and first Secretary. It later became the Royal Photographic Society under the patronage of Prince Albert.

Crimean War

It is likely that in autumn 1854, as the Crimean War grabbed the attention of the British public, that some powerful friends and patrons – among them Prince Albert and Duke of Newcastle, Secretary of State for War – urged Fenton to go to the Crimea to record the happenings. The London print publisher Thomas Agnew & Sons became his commercial sponsor. The resulting photographs may have been intended to offset the general unpopularity of the war among the British people, and to counteract the occasionally critical reporting of correspondent William Howard Russell of The Times; the photographs were to be converted into woodblocks and published in the less critical Illustrated London News. He set off aboard HMS Hecla in February, landed at Balaklava on 8 March and remained there until 22 June. Fenton took Marcus Sparling as his photographic assistant, a servant known as William and a large horse-drawn van of equipment.

Due to the size and cumbersome nature of his photographic equipment, Fenton was limited in his choice of motifs. Because the photographic material of his time needed long exposures, he was only able to produce pictures of stationary objects, mostly posed pictures. He also avoided taking pictures of dead, injured or mutilated soldiers, but his images of people included a woman working as a Vivandière. 

But he photographed the landscape, including an area near to where the Charge of the Light Brigade – made famous in Tennyson's poem – took place. The photograph does not show the actual location of the charge, which took place in a long, broad valley several miles to the south-east. In letters home soldiers had called the original valley "The Valley of Death", and Tennyson's poem used the same phrase, so when in September 1855 Thomas Agnew put the picture on show, as one of a series of eleven collectively titled Panorama of the Plateau of Sebastopol in Eleven Parts in a London exhibition, he assigned the troops'—and Tennyson's—epithet, expanded as The Valley of the Shadow of Death with its deliberate evocation of Psalm 23, to the piece.

In 2007 film-maker Errol Morris went to Sevastopol to identify the site of this "first iconic photograph of war". He identified the small valley, shown on a later map as "The Valley of the Shadow of Death", as the place where Fenton had taken his photograph (see right). Two pictures had been taken of this area, one with several cannonballs on the road, the other with an empty road. Hitherto opinions differed concerning which one was taken first but Morris spotted evidence that the photo without the cannonballs was taken first. He remains uncertain about why balls were moved onto the road in the second picture—perhaps, he notes, Fenton deliberately placed them there to enhance the image. The alternative is that soldiers were gathering up cannonballs for reuse and they threw down balls higher up the hill onto the road and ditch for collection later. Other art historians, such as Nigel Spivey of Cambridge University, identify the images as from the nearby Woronzoff Road. In June 1855 illustrator and war correspondent William Simpson produced a watercolour of the Woronzoff Road, but looking downhill, which has cannonballs similarly placed to those shown by Fenton; Simpson's publisher too used the title "The Valley of the Shadow of Death". This is the location accepted by the local tour guides.

Despite summer high temperatures, breaking several ribs in a fall, suffering from cholera and also becoming depressed at the carnage he witnessed at Sevastopol, in all Fenton managed to make over 350 usable large-format negatives. An exhibition of 312 prints was soon on show in London, and at various places across the nation in the months that followed. Fenton also showed them to Queen Victoria and Prince Albert and also to Emperor Napoleon III in Paris. Nevertheless, sales were not as good as expected.

Post Crimea
Despite the lack of commercial success for his Crimean photographs, Fenton later travelled widely over Britain to record landscapes and still life images. However, as time moved on, photography became more accessible to the general public. Many people sought to profit from selling quick portraits to common people. It is likely that Fenton, from a wealthy background, disdained 'trade' photographers, but nevertheless still wanted to profit from the art by taking exclusive images and selling them at good prices. This led to conflict with many of his peers who genuinely needed to make money from photography and were willing to 'cheapen their art' (as Fenton saw it), and also with the Photographic Society, who believed that no photographer should soil himself with the 'sin' of exploiting his talent commercially in any manner.

Amongst Fenton's photographic subjects from this period are the City of Westminster, including The Palace of Westminster nearing completion in 1857 – almost certainly the earliest images of the building, and the only photographs showing the incomplete Clock Tower.

Later work
 
In 1858 Fenton made studio genre studies based on romantically imaginative ideas of Muslim life, such as Seated Odalisque, using friends and models who were not always convincing in their roles. Although well-known for his Crimean War photography, his photographic career lasted little more than a decade, and in 1862 he sold his equipment and abandoned the profession entirely, returning to the law as a barrister. Although almost forgotten by the time of his death seven years later, he was later formally recognised by art historians for his pioneering work and artistic endeavour.
In 1862 the organising committee for the International Exhibition in London announced its plans to place photography, not with the other fine arts as had been done in the Manchester Art Treasures Exhibition only five years earlier, but in the section reserved for machinery, tools and instruments – photography was considered a craft, for tradesmen. For Fenton and many of his colleagues, this was conclusive proof of photography's diminished status, and the pioneers drifted away.

Three of his children Josephine (d.1850). Ann (d.1855) and Anthony (d.1861) are buried on the east side of Highgate Cemetery in a plot adjoining the grave of Christina Rossetti and Elizabeth Siddal. He moved with his remaining family from Albert Terrace, Regent's Park to Potters Bar, Middlesex, perhaps for healthier air, where he died on 8 August 1869 after a week-long illness, aged 50. His wife died in 1886. Their graves were destroyed in 1969 when the Potters Bar church where they were buried was deconsecrated and demolished.

In 2005, 90 of Fenton's images were included in a special exhibition devoted to this "most important nineteenth-century photographer" at the  Tate Britain gallery, London. In 2007, Fenton was inducted into the International Photography Hall of Fame and Museum.

See also
 History of photography
 Felice Beato
 John McCosh
 L'Entente Cordiale
 The Queen's Target

Notes

References

Further reading

External links

Crimean War: First Conflict to Be Documented in Detail by Photography
Photographs by Roger Fenton in the National Army Museum
Encyclopædia Britannica

19th-century British journalists
19th-century English photographers
1819 births
1869 deaths
Alumni of University College London
Artists' Rifles soldiers
British male journalists
British people of the Crimean War
English photojournalists
Orientalist painters
People from Heywood, Greater Manchester
Photography in Turkey
Photography in Ukraine
Pioneers of photography
War photographers
Photographers from Lancashire